Group B of the 2016 Fed Cup Europe/Africa Zone Group II was one of two pools in the Europe/Africa zone of the 2016 Fed Cup. Four teams competed in a round robin competition, with the top team and the bottom teams proceeding to their respective sections of the play-offs: the top team played for advancement to Group I, while the third placed team faced potential relegation to Group III. The bottom team was automatically relegated to Group III.

Standings

Round-robin

Liechtenstein vs. Bosnia and Herzegovina

Egypt vs. Austria

Liechtenstein vs. Austria

Egypt vs. Bosnia and Herzegovina

Egypt vs. Liechtenstein

Austria vs. Bosnia and Herzegovina

References

External links 
 Fed Cup website

A2